Hunter Buchanan Farquharson (born 1958) is an Anglican priest.

Born on 19 July 1958, he was educated at the Birmingham School of Speech and Drama and Edinburgh Theological College. He was ordained in 1989 and began his career as a curate in West Fife.

References

1958 births
Alumni of Edinburgh Theological College
Living people
Provosts of St Ninian's Cathedral, Perth
Scottish Episcopalian clergy